Zoe Robinson is a British boccia player who won a gold medal in the Team BC1–2 event at the 2008 Summer Paralympics in Beijing, China. She went on to win a bronze in the same event at the 2012 Summer Paralympics in London, UK.

Life
Robinson was born in Bury and went to school in the Tottington area of Greater Manchester.

At the 2008 Games Robinson competed in the BC1-2 mixed team and the B2 mixed individual events. She was eliminated at the group stage of the individual competition after losing all three of her matches. Alongside Robinson in the British quartet for the BC1-2 team competition were Nigel Murray, the individual silver medallist in Beijing who had previously won gold at the 2000 Summer Paralympics, Dan Bentley and David Smith. Victories over Canada, Argentina, Norway and China earned Great Britain a place in the final against reigning gold medallists Portugal. An 8−4 win gave Britain their first ever team gold in Paralympic Boccia.

References

External links
 

Year of birth missing (living people)
Living people
Paralympic boccia players of Great Britain
Paralympic gold medalists for Great Britain
Paralympic bronze medalists for Great Britain
Paralympic medalists in boccia
Boccia players at the 2008 Summer Paralympics
Boccia players at the 2012 Summer Paralympics
Medalists at the 2012 Summer Paralympics
Sportspeople from Bury, Greater Manchester